Bogdan Medaković (Novi Sad, 14 April 1854 - Vienna, 11 May 1930) was an Austro-Hungarian lawyer and politician. He was the president of the Croatian Parliament in the Austro-Hungarian monarchy, from 1906 to 1918.

Biography
Bogdan Medaković was born in Novi Sad on 14 April 1852, as the son of Danilo Medaković. After finishing school and obtaining the title of Doctor of Laws in Vienna at the age of only 21, he worked for some time in the court in Sremska Mitrovica, and in 1879 he opened an independent law office in Zagreb. He began his political career in 1883 when he entered the Croatian Parliament as a member elected in the Serb district. In Parliament, he was engaged in the newly established Serbian Independent Club, as its secretary. In 1896, he was elected president of the Serbian Orthodox Church Municipality in Zagreb, a position he held until 1909. He was elected a deputy at the Serbian National-Church Assembly in Sremski Karlovci.

Advocating for harmony and a political alliance with the Croats in the Austro-Hungarian monarchy, as the leader of the Serb Independent Party, Bogdan Medaković actively participated in the adoption of the Zadar Resolution with Svetozar Pribićević, which resulted in the creation of the Croat-Serb Coalition. As a prominent Zagreb lawyer, he participated in the defence of "traitors" in the trial against 53 Serbs before the Zagreb court table. He was also involved in the defence at Vienna's "treasonous trial" against Heinrich Friedjung, the Austrian historian and journalist.

Medaković was elected president of the Croatian Parliament in 1906 and remained in that position until 1918. As Speaker of Parliament, he was a member of the Magnate House in the Hungarian Parliament. As the then President of the Parliament in 1918, he declared the severance of state-legal ties with the Hungarian and Austrian empires, which opened the way to the creation of the Kingdom of Serbs Croats and Slovenes.

Bogdan Medaković was also distinguished himself as a follower of Matijević's idea of creating "Privrednik". 1897, and his activities on the founding of the newspaper "Srpsko kolo", which was published in Zagreb until 1903, were also noticed.

Medaković was a determined fighter in the fight for the preservation of church-school autonomy, for freedom of speech and for the parliamentary system in then Croatia. He advocated a joint struggle with the Croats for Yugoslavia.

After the creation of the Kingdom of Serbs, Croats and Slovenes, Bogdan Medaković withdrew from politics.

In Zagreb, he built one of the most beautiful residential palaces on Zrinjski Square 15, which was originally almost the same as the Adam House in Budapest (Bródy Sándor Street No. 4). [1]

Zrinjevac 15, built by dr. Bogdan Medaković, where academician Dejan Medaković was born in 1922. His grandson was academician Dejan Medaković (1922—2008).

See also
 Ljubomir Davidović
 Svetozar Pribićević

1854 births
1930 deaths
Austro-Hungarian politicians
Austro-Hungarian lawyers
Politicians from Novi Sad